The  opened in Abashiri, Hokkaidō, Japan in 1991. Dedicated to the various peoples of the North, across Eurasia and the Americas, the collection includes items relating to the Sámi, Nanai, and Northwest Coast Indians, as well as the more local Okhotsk culture and Ainu.

See also
 Hokkaido Museum
 Hakodate City Museum of Northern Peoples
 List of Historic Sites of Japan (Hokkaidō)

References

External links

 Hokkaido Museum of Northern Peoples 
 Hokkaido Museum of Northern Peoples 

Museums in Hokkaido
Abashiri, Hokkaido
Museums established in 1991
1991 establishments in Japan
Ethnic museums
Ainu